In geometry, an enneagram (🟙 U+1F7D9) is a nine-pointed plane figure. It is sometimes called a nonagram, nonangle, or enneagon.

The word 'enneagram' combines the numeral prefix ennea- with the Greek suffix -gram. The gram suffix derives from γραμμῆς (grammēs) meaning a line.

Regular enneagram

A regular enneagram is a 9-sided star polygon. It is constructed using the same points as the regular enneagon, but the points are connected in fixed steps. Two forms of regular enneagram exist:
 
One form connects every second point and is represented by the Schläfli symbol {9/2}.
The other form connects every fourth point and is represented by the Schläfli symbol {9/4}.

There is also a star figure, {9/3} or 3{3}, made from the regular enneagon points but connected as a compound of three equilateral triangles. (If the triangles are alternately interlaced, this results in a Brunnian link.) This star figure is sometimes known as the star of Goliath, after {6/2} or 2{3}, the star of David.

Other enneagram figures

The nine-pointed star or enneagram can also symbolize the nine gifts or fruits of the Holy Spirit.

In popular culture
The heavy metal band Slipknot previously used the {9/3} star figure enneagram  and currently uses the {9/4} polygon as a symbol. The prior figure can be seen on the cover of All Hope Is Gone.

See also
List of regular star polygons
Baháʼí symbols

References

Bibliography
John H. Conway, Heidi Burgiel, Chaim Goodman-Strass, The Symmetries of Things 2008,  (Chapter 26. pp. 404: Regular star-polytopes Dimension 2)

External links

Nonagram -- from Wolfram MathWorld

9 (number)
09